Tavria Okruha was an administrative subdivision of the Ukrainian State (Ukraine) created in April 1918. The okruha was governed by a starosta from Berdiansk. The territory was named after the Crimean Peninsula.

Following withdrawal of the forces of the Central powers in late 1918, Russian tri-colors of the Armed Forces of South Russia were raised in most of the okruha, except for a few localities in Dnipro County closer to Kherson Governorate.

After the Bolsheviks took control, the okruha was split between the Kherson Governorate and Oleksandrivsk (Zaporizhzhia) Governorate.

Subdivisions
 Dnipro County
 Melitopol County
 Berdiansk County

Governors
 summer–fall 1918: Oleksandr Desnytskyi (gubernatorial starosta)
 1918–1919: Ihor Lutskenko (as Kherson gubernatorial commissar)

See also
 Administrative divisions of Ukraine (1918-1925)

History of Crimea
Okruhas of Ukraine
States and territories established in 1918
States and territories disestablished in 1918